Perkins Branch is a  long 1st order tributary to Aarons Creek in Mecklenburg County, Virginia.

Course 
Perkins Branch rises about 0.25 miles west of Siddon, Virginia, and then flows west to join Aarons Creek about 1.5 miles north-northwest of Nelson.

Watershed 
Perkins Branch drains  of area, receives about 45.2 in/year of precipitation, has a wetness index of 460.03, and is about 55% forested.

See also 
 List of Virginia Rivers

References 

Rivers of Virginia
Rivers of Mecklenburg County, Virginia
Tributaries of the Roanoke River